One Way was an American R&B and funk band that was popular in the late 1970s, and throughout most of the 1980s, led by singer Al Hudson. The group's most successful record was "Cutie Pie", which reached number 4 on the Billboard Soul Singles chart and number 61 on the pop chart in 1982.

Al Hudson and the (Soul) Partners
Detroit vocalist Al Hudson, guitarist Dave Roberson and bassist Kevin McCord founded Al Hudson and the Soul Partners in the mid '70s. Other members included keyboardists Jack Hall and Jonathan "Corky" Meadows, drummers Theodore Dudley and Gregory Greene, Gary Andrews and guitarist Cortez Harris. 

They recorded several singles for Atco Records before joining ABC Records and made their debut with the LP Especially for You in 1977. They recorded their second album Cherish that same year and released their third album Spreading Love in 1978 from which the single Spread Love was released. Although not charting in the UK, it became a big hit in the clubs. By that time ABC Records was in the process of being bought by MCA Records and vocalist Alicia Myers joined the group. They released the album Happy Feet as Al Hudson and the Partners in 1979 which contains the R&B hit "You Can Do It" which was co-penned by Myers. The single also peaked at number 10 on Billboard’s Disco Action Top 80 Chart in June 1979, as well as a top 15 hit in the UK.

One Way
When the band moved to the MCA label, they subsequently changed their name to One Way featuring Al Hudson. Their next album was simply called One Way Featuring Al Hudson and was also released in 1979. The album included the long 12" version of "You Can Do It". Their 1980 album was also confusingly called One Way featuring Al Hudson. By 1981 the band was simply called One Way. 

In 1981 frontwoman Alicia Myers left the band to pursue a solo career. She was replaced by Candyce Edwards, who served as female lead of the group from 1981 to 1985. Edwards' debut was on the Fancy Dancer album and she remained with the group throughout their biggest successes. After Edwards left the group, Jeanette Mack-Jackson became the Lead female vocalist of One Way. She still sings with them, She’s been with the group for 30 years and she is also on many albums singing.

They were on MCA from 1979 to 1988. They scored five top 10 U.S. R&B chart hits, with the biggest being "Cutie Pie", which reached number four in 1982.

They had two more minor hits on the UK Singles Chart with "Music" (1979) and "Let's Talk" (1985).

They moved to Capitol Records in 1988, where they released their final album, A New Beginning, later that same year. By this time, only Hudson, Roberson, and Meadows remained from the original line-up.

In 2019, after a 31-year hiatus, One Way featuring Al Hudson released their 12th album, New Old School.

Discography

Albums

Compilation albums
1993: Cutie Pie
1995: Push
1996: The Best of One Way: Featuring Al Hudson and Alicia Myers
2005: 20th Century Masters: Millennium Collection

Singles

Al Hudson and the Soul Partners

One Way

References

External links

Soul and Funk Music database

American funk musical groups
American soul musical groups
African-American musical groups
American dance music groups
Musical groups from Detroit
American rhythm and blues musical groups